Ariel Behar (born November 12, 1989 in Montevideo) is a Uruguayan professional tennis player.  He specializes in men's doubles and has won three ATP titles with Ecuadorian partner Gonzalo Escobar. His career-high doubles ranking is World No. 39 achieved on 31 January 2022.
He has taken part of the Uruguay Davis Cup team since 2009.

Personal
Behar played tennis for the first time at 3 years old and began playing seriously aged 10. Growing up, he admired Roger Federer and Andre Agassi. He is from a Jewish family but is "not a big fan" of religion.

Professional career

2012-2017: ATP and Grand Slam debut
Since the mid 2010s, Behar competed primarily on the ATP Challenger Tour, where he has won 22 doubles titles.

Partnering with Aliaksandr Bury, he was a semi-finalist at the 2017 Estoril Open, an ATP 250 tournament.

He entered the main draw at the 2017 Wimbledon Championships, his first appearance at a Grand Slam.

2018-2022: Three doubles titles, top 50 
Partnering with Ecuadorian Gonzalo Escobar, Behar won two ATP titles at the 2021 Delray Beach Open and the 2021 Andalucía Open and reached three other finals on the ATP tour in 2021 after winning two ATP Challenger Tour titles together in 2020. He entered the top 50 following the final at the 2021 Serbia Open on 26 April 2021. The pair has also won a total of 8 Challenger titles.

Behar finished the year 2021 ranked No. 41, a career-high doubles ranking.

In 2022, he reached a fourth final and won his third ATP 250 title with Behar at the 2022 Serbia Open defeating top seeds Mate Pavic and Nikola Mektic.

ATP career finals

Doubles: 9 (3 titles, 6 runner-ups)

Challenger and Futures finals

Doubles: 55 (26–29)

Best Grand Slam results details

Doubles

 Because of a delay in schedule due to rain, the first two rounds of the competition were played best-of-three sets instead of the usual best-of-five format.

Wins over top 10 players

Doubles
Behar has a  record against players who were, at the time the match was played, ranked in the top 10.

Notes

References

External links
 
 
 
 

1989 births
Living people
Uruguayan male tennis players
Sportspeople from Montevideo
Tennis players at the 2015 Pan American Games
Tennis players at the 2011 Pan American Games
Pan American Games competitors for Uruguay
Uruguayan people of Jewish descent